Roy Thompson may refer to:
 Mat Roy Thompson (1874–1962), aka Roy Thompson, American civil engineer and builder of Scotty's Castle
 Roy Thompson (footballer) (1905–1981), Australian rules footballer
 Roy Thompson (politician) (born 1946), Northern Irish Unionist politician
 Roy Thompson (rugby league) (1916–2001), Australian rugby league footballer

See also
Roy Thomson, 1st Baron Thomson of Fleet, Canadian-born British businessman
Roy Hendry Thomson, Scottish politician